Damping is a technique in music for altering the sound of a musical instrument by reducing oscillations or vibrations. Damping methods are used for a number of instruments.

Strings
Damping is often necessary on string instruments such as the bass or violin where sympathetic resonance can excite other strings creating undesired noise. This phenomenon can be remedied by keeping fingers such as the thumb on the strings where the vibration is unwanted.

On guitar, damping (also referred to as choking) is a technique where, shortly after playing the strings, the sound is reduced by pressing the right hand palm against the strings, right hand damping (including palm muting), or relaxing the left hand fingers' pressure on the strings, left hand damping (or left-hand muting). Scratching is where the strings are played while damped, i.e., the strings are damped before playing. The term presumably refers to the clunky sound produced. In funk music this is often done over a sixteenth note pattern with occasional sixteenths undamped.

Floating is the technique where a chord is sustained past a sixteenth note rather than that note being scratched, the term referring to the manner in which the right hand "floats" over the strings rather than continuing to scratch.

Skanking is when a note is isolated by left hand damping of the two strings adjacent to the fully fretted string, producing the desired note (the adjacent strings are scratched). The technique is especially popular among ska, rocksteady and reggae guitarists, who use it with virtually every riddim they play on.

Piano
When a piano key is pressed, the damper for that note is raised and a hammer strikes the string. Unless the sustain pedal is depressed, releasing the key allows the damper to return to place, damping the note.

Percussion 

Percussion instruments, such as timpani or cymbals, often resonate for a long time. To control the length of the notes, percussionists will often have to either place their hands on the instrument or use a pedal mechanism as in the case of tubular bells and pedal glockenspiels.

Mallet dampening on the vibraphone is an important technique that facilitates legato phrasing on the instrument. It is accomplished by striking a note on one of the bars of the instrument while the pedal is depressed and then using the head of the same or another mallet to stop the vibrations of the bar without raising the pedal.

There are many benefits of being proficient in this technique as a vibraphonist. As it allows a player to hold out one chord and add or subtract any individual pitch desired, a vibist can transition between chords much more smoothly than a pianist who cannot stop a string from vibrating without reaching inside the instrument when the pedal is down. Most modern vibraphonists are highly skilled in this technique.

On cymbals, choking is an important technique that can add punctuation or heighten musical tension.

Hammered dulcimers
While the keys on modern pianos control both the hammers and dampers, this is not possible with the hand-held hammers used to play some other members of the box zither family. Historical players such as Joseph Moskowitz sometimes used their coat sleeves as dampers, but pedal-operated dampers were one of the main distinguishing features of the concert cimbalom developed by Jószef Schunda in 1874 and are now often added to larger or more expensive American hammered dulcimers, Eastern European dulcimers, and Greek sandouris. They are rarely if ever found on the Romanian ţambal mic, the Iranian santur, or the Indian santoor

See also
Cymbal choke
Ghost note
Mute

References

Musical techniques